East West Metro Tunnel is a constructed underwater river tunnel of Kolkata Metro in Kolkata, West Bengal. The river tunnel is constructed underneath Hooghly River. After the CESC Tunnel in 1931, this is the second underwater river tunnel of Hooghly River. Besides, It is the biggest underwater river tunnel of South Asia and as well as India, which is made for metro rail service. A  stretch of the tracks will go through a tunnel under the Hooghly River. The tunnel is been completed in 2021. The tunnel is used by East West Metro Line for metro rail service and constructed by Kolkata Metro Rail Corporation.

Construction 

The section between Sealdah metro station and Mahakaran metro station was realigned due to the inability of GoWB to provide land on the surface along the original route. Even on the new alignment a station planned at Wellington had to be dropped as Government of West Bengal  was unable to provide the required land on the surface. Work at Howrah Maidan have started in March 2016. The section between Howrah Maidan metro station and Esplanade metro station has been built by Afcons – Transtonnelstroy JV team, two tunnel boring machines from Herrenknecht are being used to dig the tunnel. Tunnelling started from Howrah Maidan side. On 23 May one of the TBM named Rachna completed the tunneling under the Hooghly River in 36 days. The other TBM named Prerna also completed the tunnelling work under the river on 21 June 2017. There were some concerns during tunnelling under Brabourne Road as the tunnel would pass within  of heritage structures and there were also many old and dilapidated buildings in this section. KMRC received permission from Archaeological Survey of India in June 2017. Residents and shops in the old building were temporarily shifted and the buildings were reinforced before construction of tunnel. Construction of tunnel until Mahakaran station was completed in November 2017. For the Mahakaran–Esplanade section tunnelling of one of the tunnel has been completed on 23 March 2018 the other tunnel has also been completed by April. In this sections also shops and residents of the buildings have been shifted in phased manner before tunnelling. The Esplanade–Sealdah section will be executed by ITD-ITD Cementation JV and was scheduled to start in May 2018.

5490 meters of tunnel have been constructed between Subhash Sarovar and Sealdah. This section was constructed by ITD-ITD Cementation JV. All the cross passes between the two tunnels have also been completed. Track laying is being carried out in this section. The tunneling work was stopped due to collapse of building on 3 September 2019 over the Bowbazar area due to TBM hitting an aquifer. The work resumed in June, 2020 and successfully completed the affected area.

As the  work began, the national & regional media claimed this project as a big milestone terming India’s first under water and “underwater river” metro tunnel, but it's not true. While the Hooghly river is very wide and requires tons of engineering challenges in constructing tunnels, there are other metro lines built in India cities which get the discussed titles, including Kolkata metro's operational Line-1 as the first one:

• Kolkata Metro Line 1 (Blue): Under the Circular Canal falling between the Shyambazar and Belgachia metro stations. (built in 1990s) Today, East-West Metro also passes under this canal between Phoolbagan and Sealdah metro stations.

• Delhi Metro Line 2 (Yellow): Under the Najafgarh Drain in northern Delhi (built in 2007) and Kushak Drain in southern Delhi (built in 2009).

• Chennai Metro Line 1 (Blue): Under the Cooum River in central Chennai while passing from the Government Estate to Chennai Central metro station (built in 2015-17).

Timelines 

 2009: Contract for building the underground section from Subhash Sarabor to Central Station awarded to ITD-ITD Cementation JV.
 2009: Physical construction of E–W corridor starts.
 2010: Contract for building the underground section from Central to Howrah Maidan awarded to Afcons.
 2012: Realignment proposed to avoid shifting of 80 families from Bowbazar and hawkers from Brabourne Road.
 2015: Realignment approved by Railways and JICA in between Sealdah to Howrah station.
 2015: Subodh Mullick Square station, a key stop in the revised blueprint, done away with to avoid eviction of hawkers.
 2017-March: Afcons nicknames the tunnel boring machines as Prerna and Rachna inspired from the names of daughter of their employee.
 2017 – May 23: First TBM completes tunneling the eastbound tunnel under the Hooghly river.
 2017 – June 21: Second TBM completes tunneling the westbound tunnel under the river Hooghly.
 2017-June: Permission received from Archaeological Survey of India for construction of tunnel within 100 meters of three heritage buildings.
 2017-July: Tram depot at Esplanade shifted to facilitate construction of Metro Station.
 2017-July: People from 11 buildings in Brebourne Road evacuated in phased manner when the TBM's passes below these old buildings.
 2017-August: Mini-bus stand at Mahakaran shifted to facilitate the construction of underground station.
 2017-December: Tunnelling between Mahakaran station and Esplanade station on going.
 2018 – March 23: First TBM named Prerna reaches Esplanade station completing the section from Howrah Maidan to Esplanade. This tunnel will be used by Howrah bound tunnel.
 2018 – Apr 5: Second TBM named Rachna completes boring of second tunnel between Howrah Maidan and Esplanade station.
2019 – Apr 14: Tunneling stopped due to lack of muck cars, and needed to be upgraded. Work started again after 5 days. 
2019 – Jun 23: TBMs Rachna & Prerna, after being parked at Curzon Park for few months, are finally being taken out.
2019 – July 3: Both the TBMs are successfully taken out and loaded on trailers. With this, Rachna and Prerna's journey of tunneling under a river comes to an end.
2021-May: Tunnelling for East West Metro project completed.

References 

Kolkata Metro
Railway tunnels in West Bengal
Proposed rail infrastructure in India
Proposed tunnels in Asia